Khalid Al-Balochi (Arabic:خالد البلوشي) (born 22 March 1999) is an Emirati footballer who plays as a midfielder for Al Ain.

External links

References

1999 births
Emirati footballers
Emirati people of Baloch descent
Living people
Al Ain FC players
UAE Pro League players
Association football midfielders
Place of birth missing (living people)